If You're Dreaming is the second studio album by American musician Anna Burch. It was released on April 3, 2020 under Polyvinyl Record Co.

Critical reception 
If You're Dreaming was met with "generally favorable" reviews from critics. At Metacritic, which assigns a weighted average rating out of 100 to reviews from mainstream publications, this release received an average score of 74, based on 12 reviews. Aggregator Album of the Year gave the release a 75 out of 100 based on a critical consensus of 17 reviews.

Aimee Cliff from Pitchfork said of the album: "The Detroit singer-songwriter’s second album is sparser, lonelier, and more patient, allowing the candor of her lyrics to shine through."

Track listing

Personnel 

Musicians
 Anna Burch – Primary Artist

Production
 Sam Evian – Producer

References 

2020 albums
Pop albums by American artists